Aruna Miller (née Katragadda; November 6, 1964) is an American politician who is serving as the tenth lieutenant governor of Maryland since 2023. Miller, a Democrat, is a former member of the Maryland House of Delegates representing Legislative District 15 in Montgomery County. Miller ran for Congress in 2018 to represent Maryland's 6th congressional district, and lost the Democratic primary to David Trone by 9.3%, with 30.7% of the vote compared to Trone's 40.0%.

In December 2021, Wes Moore chose Miller as his running mate in the Democratic primary of the 2022 Maryland gubernatorial election. They won the Democratic nomination on July 19, 2022, and defeated Republican nominee Dan Cox and his running mate Gordana Schifanelli on November 8, 2022. Miller is the first South Asian woman elected lieutenant governor in the United States, as well as the first Asian American lieutenant governor and first immigrant to hold statewide office in Maryland, and the second female lieutenant governor after Kathleen Kennedy Townsend.

Early life and education
Miller was born November 6, 1964, in Andhra Pradesh, India. Her family came to the United States when she was seven years old. Along with her two siblings and parents, she lived in Poughkeepsie, New York, where IBM employed her father as a mechanical engineer. She attended public schools in Upstate New York and Ballwin, Missouri. Miller earned a Bachelor of Science degree in civil engineering from the Missouri University of Science and Technology.

Career
Miller worked as a transportation engineer for local governments in California, Virginia, and Hawaii. She moved to Maryland in 1990, where she worked for the Montgomery County Department of Transportation. She has overseen programs that advanced access to schools, employment centers, and community facilities that are safe for pedestrians, bicyclists, transit users, and people with differing abilities. In 2015, she retired from Montgomery County to devote her full attention to her service in the Maryland legislature.

Miller became a citizen of the United States in 2000 and voted in the 2000 United States presidential election for Vice President of the United States Al Gore. She became frustrated with the Supreme Court's decision in Bush v. Gore, and subsequently became involved with politics by volunteering to help other candidates get elected. During the 2004 United States presidential election, she worked as a precinct-level volunteer for the Democratic Party and nominee John Kerry. In 2006, Miller was appointed to serve as an at-large member of the Montgomery County Democratic Central Committee and served in that position until 2010.

Maryland House of Delegates 

After state delegate Craig L. Rice announced that he would run for the Montgomery County Council in 2010, activists in the Montgomery County Democratic Party called Miller to ask her to run. She initially declined to run, but changed her mind after talking with her husband. Miller won election to District 15 of the Maryland House of Delegates, succeeding Rice. After Rice resigned to take office in the Montgomery County Council, Miller received support from fellow members of the Montgomery County Democratic Central Committee, who voted to recommend that Governor Martin O'Malley appoint her to finish Rice's term. Miller was then appointed to represent District 15 of the Maryland House of Delegates, succeeding Rice. Miller was the first Indian American woman to be elected to the Maryland Legislature.

In 2012, Miller served as an at-large delegate to the Democratic National Convention, pledged to President Barack Obama.

In her first term (2010–2015), Miller served on the Ways and Means Committee and its Revenue, Transportation, and Education Subcommittees. In her second term (2015–2019), Miller served on the Appropriations Committee, where served as chair of the Oversight of Personnel Subcommittee, vice chair of the Transportation and Environment Subcommittee, and vice chair of the Capital Budget Subcommittee.

Committees and commissions 

 President, Women Legislators of Maryland, Maryland General Assembly, 2016–2017
 Chair, House Appropriations Oversight of Personnel Subcommittee, 2015–2019
 Vice-chair, House Appropriations Transportation and Environment Subcommittee, 2015–2019
 Vice-chair, House Appropriations Capital Budget Subcommittee, 2016–2019
 Member, Maryland Advisory Council for Virtual Learning, 2012–2015
 Commissioner, Interstate Commission on the Potomac River Basin, 2013–2019
 Member, Business Climate Work Group, Maryland General Assembly, 2013–2014
 Member, Joint Committee on Cybersecurity, Information Technology, and Biotechnology, 2015–2019
 Member, Joint Committee on Fair Practices and State Personnel Oversight, 2015–2019
 Founding Member, Maryland Legislative Asian-American, and Pacific-Islander Caucus 2015–2019
 Member, Maryland Sexual Assault Evidence Kit Policy and Funding Committee, 2017–2019
 Commissioner, 21st Century School Facilities Commission, 2016–2017
 Member, Maryland State Ethics Commission, 2019–2020

2018 congressional election 

In May 2017, Miller told The Baltimore Sun that she would run for Congress in Maryland's 6th congressional district if John Delaney decided to pursue a campaign for governor. On July 28, 2017, Miller announced her candidacy in the United States House of Representatives election to replace Delaney, who said he would not run for re-election to instead run for president in 2020. In April 2018, Miller won a straw poll of Democratic activists in Western Maryland. During the election, she was endorsed by the National Education Association, the Sierra Club, EMILY's List, 314 Action, and Sen. Kirsten Gillibrand, Rep. Pramila Jayapal, and then County Executive Ike Leggett, among others.

Despite having received the most individual donations out of her Democratic opponents, Miller was outspent in the primary 13:1 by David Trone, the largest self-funding congressional candidate in U.S. history, and lost the primary to Trone by 9.3%, with 30.7% of the vote compared to Trone's 40.0%, and consequently did not advance to the general election. She won Montgomery County but this was the only voting district she won outright. Had she been elected, Miller would have been the only woman in Maryland's congressional delegation.

Post-legislative career

In February 2019, Miller was named the new executive director of Indian American Impact.

In January 2021, Miller filed paperwork to run for Congress again had Trone decided against running for a third-term. After Trone launched his re-election bid on May 7, Miller declined to comment on her 2022 plans.

Lieutenant Governor of Maryland

Elections

2022 
In December 2021, Wes Moore selected Miller as his running mate in the Democratic primary of the 2022 Maryland gubernatorial election. The Moore-Miller ticket won the Democratic primary election on July 19, 2022.

In October 2022, The Intercept reported that Moore and Miller were honored at a fundraiser hosted by individuals associated with Hindutva, or a Hindu nationalist political ideology. The fundraiser occurred after the Moore campaign added a page to its website to lay out "the facts" about Miller's record on supporting Muslim communities and religious freedom. The website page indicated that the campaign "had not taken one dollar" from the Hindutva movement. In a November interview with Bethesda Magazine, Miller denied participating in fundraisers with Hindu nationalists, and said that she felt an unfair spotlight had been focused on her because she is Indian-American and grew up in a Hindu-Christian household.

The ticket defeated Republican nominees Dan Cox and Gordana Schifanelli in the general election on November 8, 2022. Miller is the first South Asian woman elected lieutenant governor in the United States, and the first Asian American lieutenant governor and first immigrant to hold statewide office in Maryland. Miller served as the chair of the transition team for Governor-elect Moore.

Tenure 
Miller was sworn in on January 18, 2023. She took the oath of office on the Bhagavad Gita, making her first lieutenant governor to do so.

In February 2022, Miller became the first woman of color to chair the Maryland Board of Public Works meeting after Governor Moore recused himself from a vote related to a contract between the Maryland Department of Health and Under Armour, a company he has financial holdings in.

Political positions

Education 
In 2013, Miller co-sponsored legislation that would require schools to start after Labor Day. In August 2016, Governor Larry Hogan released a statement that included a number of county legislators, including Miller, that supported his decision to move the state's school start date to after Labor Day.

During the 2014 legislative session, Miller introduced legislation that would create a state study to review school start times and how sleep affected academic performance and school activities. The bill passed and was signed into law by Governor O'Malley on April 4. In 2016, Miller introduced legislation that would recognize school systems as "Orange Ribbon Schools" if they had elementary school classes starting after 8am and middle school classes after 8:30am. The bill passed and was signed into law by Governor Hogan.

In 2018, Miller introduced legislation that would require high schools to offer at least one high-quality computer science course and encourages local school districts to integrate computer science into their earlier grades.

Economy 
In 2013, Miller was one of ten Maryland lawmakers named to the Maryland Business Climate Work Group designed to make recommendations and develop long-term plans to streamline business regulations, encourage business innovation, and develop public-private partnerships to finance infrastructure

Miller encouraged strengthening economic and cultural development between Maryland and India and accompanied Governor Martin O'Malley on a trade mission to India in 2011, which resulted in nearly $60 million in business deals for the state of Maryland. Delegate Miller took a lead role in working with the Office of the Secretary of State and the Department of Economic Development to coordinate the Governor's arrangements for his first stop to Hyderabad.

During her first term as a state delegate, Miller introduced one of the early Maryland bills for paid family leave.

In her second term, while serving as chair of the Oversight of Personnel Subcommittee, Miller was the floor leader for multiple bills expanding collective bargaining for employees.

Miller stood in opposition to excluding nail salon workers from being eligible to receive unemployment benefits

In February 2018, Miller voted for a bill that would provide $5.6 billion in tax incentives to Amazon to build their second headquarters in Montgomery County.

Environment 
One of Miller's first actions after being elected to the Maryland General Assembly was to co-sponsor the Marcellus Shale Act of 2011, which laid the groundwork for the eventual passage of Maryland's fracking ban, which she co-sponsored.

In 2013, Governor Martin O'Malley appointed Miller as a commissioner to the Interstate Commission on the Potomac River Basin (ICPRB). The mission is to enhance, protect, and conserve the water and associated land resources of the Potomac River and its tributaries through regional and interstate cooperation. She served on the ICPRB until 2019.

Healthcare 
In January 2012, Miller signed onto an amicus brief in the Supreme Court case of National Federation of Independent Business v. Sebelius supporting the Affordable Care Act. During her 2018 House of Representatives campaign, Miller said she supported moving toward a single-payer healthcare system.

Gun control 
In March 2018, Miller said that the gun control provisions included in Congress's $1.3 trillion spending bill "did not go far enough." That week, she unveiled a gun control plan that included expanded research, universal background checks, an assault weapons ban, and increasing the minimum age to buy a firearm.

National politics 
Miller endorsed former Secretary of State Hillary Clinton for president on April 9, 2016. On April 17, 2019, Miller and the Indian American Impact group endorsed U.S. Senator from California Kamala Harris for president.

Opioid crisis 
In March 2018, Miller said she supported studying alternative treatments, including ibogaine and marijuana, to help patients wean themselves from opioids.

Personal life

In 1990, Miller moved to Montgomery County, Maryland, where she married her college sweetheart, David Miller. She has three adult daughters. Miller's mother lives with the family in Darnestown, Maryland.

Miller maintains her activism in community organizations and has served on the boards of Round House Theatre, Montgomery Parks Foundation, Emerge Maryland, Madison House Autism Foundation, BlackRock Center for the Arts and the Montgomery County Public Schools Educational Foundation.

Miller is a graduate of Leadership Montgomery.

Electoral history

See also 
 List of minority governors and lieutenant governors in the United States

References

External links
Campaign website
Aruna Miller MGA Legislation
Aruna Miller Maryland General Assembly Website
Financial information (federal office) at the Federal Election Commission
Profile at Vote Smart
Aruna Miller at IMDb

|-

1964 births
21st-century American politicians
21st-century American women politicians
American people of Telugu descent
American politicians of Indian descent
Asian-American people in Maryland politics
Indian emigrants to the United States
Lieutenant Governors of Maryland
Living people
Democratic Party members of the Maryland House of Delegates
Missouri University of Science and Technology alumni
Naturalized citizens of the United States
People from Germantown, Maryland
People from Hyderabad, India
People from Montgomery County, Maryland
Women in Maryland politics
Women state legislators in Maryland